The Poinsettia Fire was the second most destructive of the May 2014 San Diego County wildfires. It caused property damage estimated at $22.5 million, as well as the only reported fatality in the San Diego County series of wildfires. As of July 10, 2014, the cause of the fire is listed as "undetermined", which allows for further investigation if more information comes to light.

Fire
The Poinsettia Fire started on May 14, around 10:40 AM PDT, in the city of Carlsbad. Burning in dry brush north of El Camino Real, it began near the intersection of Poinsettia Lane and Alicante. After the fire crossed El Camino Real, evacuation orders were issued to 11,600 homes and businesses in Carlsbad. Two elementary schools and a middle school were also evacuated. By the end of the day on May 14, the fire had destroyed eight homes, an 18-unit condominium complex, and two commercial buildings. The Carlsbad Unified School District closed all schools May 15 and 16.

Firefighters said they had stopped its spread, but it was only 10% contained and additional structures were threatened. By May 16, the fire had burned  and was 85% contained. The increased containment let to the lifting of all evacuation orders.

During the evening of May 15, firefighters found a badly burned body near the site of a known transient encampment in Carlsbad.  The victim has not been identified, and the cause of death has not yet been determined.

Cause and lawsuit
No official cause for the fire has been determined, however multiple theories exist. What is known is that the fire started on the 7th hole of the La Costa Resort and Spa's golf course. Speculation points to cigarette or cigar being thrown into the dry grass along the course. A report from the Carlsbad Fire Department has also speculated that the blaze may have been ignited by a spark from golf club striking a rock.

A lawsuit filed in October 2014, alleges the resort was responsible for the fire due to "negligent maintenance and operation of its property and equipment" as well as for "failing to safeguard against the fire spreading into neighboring residential communities" once it had started. The lawsuit has multiple plaintiffs, including homeowners who lost their homes, businesses that were damaged as well as those who suffered injuries in the fire.

See also
October 2017 California wildfires
2014 California wildfires
Bernardo Fire
December 2017 Southern California wildfires

References

External links
Largest fires in San Diego County history - ABC 10News

Wildfires in San Diego County, California
2014 California wildfires
May 2014 events in the United States